Touchez pas au grisbi (French for "Don't touch the loot"), released as Honour Among Thieves in the United Kingdom and Grisbi in the United States, is a 1954 French-Italian crime film based on a novel by Albert Simonin. It was directed by Jacques Becker and stars Jean Gabin, René Dary, Paul Frankeur, Lino Ventura, Jeanne Moreau, Dora Doll, and Marilyn Buferd. The film was screened in competition at the 1954 Venice Film Festival.

The film is the first installment of the so-called "Max le Menteur trilogy", which are all based on novels by Simonin, but feature different characters; it was followed by Le cave se rebiffe and Les tontons flingueurs, both of which are more comedic than Grisbi.

Plot
Max, a principled middle-aged Parisian gangster, has dinner at Madame Bouche's restaurant, a hangout for criminals, with his longtime-associate Riton, their much younger burlesque-dancer girlfriends, and Max's protege Marco. The group then goes to crime-boss Pierrot's nightclub, where the girls perform and Max gets Marco a job as a drug dealer working for Pierrot. After the show, Max discovers Riton's girlfriend, Josy, making out with Angelo, another gangster, but he does not tell Riton.

On the way back to his apartment, Max notices he is being followed by two of Angelo's men in an ambulance. He gets the drop on them and chases them away, after which he calls Riton and warns him not to go with Angelo, who has just asked Riton to do a job with him. Max takes Riton to an apartment no one knows about and shows Riton that he has been storing the eight gold bars they stole during a recent heist at Orly Airport in the trunk of a car parked in the building's garage. Upstairs, the two friends eat a simple meal, during which Max tells Riton about Josy and Angelo and gets Riton to admit he had hinted to Josy about the big score to impress her. Max surmises Josy told Angelo, who planned to kidnap Max and Riton and beat the location of the gold out of them that night. He reveals he is sick of the criminal lifestyle and plans to retire with the money from the airport heist, and tells Riton to leave Josy to the younger Angelo.

The next morning, Max leaves early to take the gold to his uncle, a fence who tells Max he needs some time to gather enough money to buy the gold. Max returns to his apartment and finds Riton has left, so he calls the Hotel Moderna, at which both Josy and Riton live, and is told by the porter that Riton was there, but was just taken away in an ambulance. Assuming Riton went to see Josy and was caught by Angelo's men, Max considers leaving his friend in the lurch, even going to see Betty, his wealthy (possibly American) girlfriend, when she calls, but, by that night, he has decided to save Riton.

Max gets Marco, and the pair go to the Hotel Moderna, where Max roughly, but unsuccessfully, interrogates Josy and the porter about where Angelo could be hiding Riton, while Marco captures Fifi, one of Angelo's henchmen, who was watching for Max to come by. They take Fifi to the nightclub to get Pierrot's help interrogating him, but Fifi does not seem to know anything useful. Angelo, alerted to Max's location by a henchman staking out the nightclub, telephones and proposes to trade Riton for the gold, and Max agrees. He, Marco, and Pierrot arm themselves, get the gold, and head out in Fifi's car.

On a deserted country road, Riton is returned unharmed, and Max hands over the gold. After Angelo's car drives away, Riton warns Max that Angelo had traveled with a second car, which appears in the distance. Angelo's henchmen blow up Fifi's car with hand grenades, killing Marco, and come to mop up the scene, but Max, Pierrot, and Riton gun them down and take their car to chase Angelo. A shootout ensues, during which Riton is wounded and Angelo's car crashes. Angelo attempts to throw a grenade at Max's group, but he gets shot and the grenade blows him up and sets his car on fire. As a truck approaches, Max is forced to leave the gold in the hotly-burning wreck.

Back at Pierrot's, Riton is patched up by a mob doctor. Riton urges Max to go about his normal routine to avoid suspicion that he was involved in the previous night's carnage, so Max takes Betty to Madame Bouche's for lunch. Everyone is talking about the recovery of the stolen gold from the wreck of Angelo's car, and some other diners ask Max if he believes Angelo was really the thief. Max calls to check on Riton and learns Riton has died. He plays his favorite song on the jukebox and sits down to eat.

Cast

 Jean Gabin as Max, known as Max "le Menteur" ("the liar"), a Parisian criminal
 René Dary as Henri Ducros, known as "Riton" (a diminutive form of "Henri"), Max's best friend and accomplice
 Dora Doll as Lola, a dancer who is seeing Max
 Paul Frankeur as Pierrot, a night club owner and underworld boss
 Jeanne Moreau as Josy, a dancer who is leaving Riton for Angelo
 Vittorio Sanipoli as Ramon, one of Angelo's henchmen
 Marilyn Buferd as Betty, Max's wealthy girlfriend
 Gaby Basset as Marinette, Pierrot's wife and the manager of his club
 Paul Barge as Eugène, the man who helps Max carry the gold up to Oscar's office
 Alain Bouvette as Taxi Driver
 Daniel Cauchy as Fifi, Angelo's henchman that is caught by Marco and tortured by Pierrot
 Denise Clair as Madame Bouche, the owner of a restaurant
 Angelo Dessy as Bastien, one of Angelo's henchmen
 Michel Jourdan as Marco, Max's protege
 Paul Oettly as Oscar, Max's uncle and fence
 Jean Riveyre as Porter at the Hotel Moderna
 Delia Scala as Huguette, Oscar's secretary
 Umberto Silvestri as one of Angelo's henchmen
 Lucilla Solivani as Nana, Pierrot's secretary
 Lino Ventura as Angelo Fraiser, an ambitious criminal with his own gang

Background
French actor Daniel Gélin was first offered the role of Max, but he turned it down, seeing himself as too young for the part. Jean Gabin then agreed to play Max, and the film helped to relaunch his career, which had been suffering since the end of World War II.

Touchez pas au grisbi marked the film debut of Lino Ventura.

Reception
The film was the fourth-most popular release at the French box office in 1954.

On review aggregator Rotten Tomatoes, the film has a 100% approval rating based on reviews from 25 critics, with a weighted average score of 8.30/10. It is also on Roger Ebert's "Great Movies" list.

References

External links

 
 
 
Film page at Box Office Story
 Grisbi movie review at The New York Times Last accessed: July 3, 2014.
Touchez pas au grisbi: A Neglected Master an essay by Philip Kemp at the Criterion Collection
Touchez pas au grisbi: Strange Reflections an essay by Geoffrey O'Brien at the Criterion Collection

1954 films
1954 crime films
Italian gangster films
French black-and-white films
1950s French-language films
French gangster films
Films about organized crime in France
Films directed by Jacques Becker
Films with screenplays by Albert Simonin
Italian black-and-white films
1950s Italian films
1950s French films